Charles Kilpatrick may refer to:

 Charles Kilpatrick (athlete) (1874-1921), American athlete
 Charles Kilpatrick (cyclist), American entertainer
 Charles Kilpatrick (politician), trade union president and member of the Queensland Legislative Council